Elizabeth Tulip Treasure  (born January 1958) is Vice-Chancellor of Aberystwyth University in Wales, and a former consultant dentist and professor of dentistry.

Biography
Treasure studied dentistry at the University of Birmingham where she was awarded BDS and PhD degrees. Between 1980 and 1990 she worked in the National Health Service in several clinical roles. She then moved to New Zealand where she worked as a public health dentist and as a lecturer and senior lecturer at the University of Otago.

In 1995 Treasure moved back to the UK where she was appointed Senior Lecturer and Consultant in Dental Public Health at the University of Wales College of Medicine, where in 2000 she became a professor. In 2006 she was appointed Dean and General Manager of the Dental School and of the Cardiff University Dental Hospital.

Treasure's research interests include clinical effectiveness, epidemiology and clinical trials. She chaired a review of the dental workforce in Wales and was scientific adviser to the Department of Health's dental division.

In 2010, Treasure was appointed Deputy Vice-Chancellor of Cardiff University, the first woman to hold this position. She was appointed Vice Chancellor of Aberystwyth University in December 2016 and took up the post in April 2017.

Memberships and appointments 
Member of Cardiff and Vale University Health Board
Finance Committee of UCAS
Health and Safety Committee of the Universities and Colleges Employers' Association (UCEA)
British Association for the Study of Community Dentistry (President 2014-15)
Council Member of Llandaff Cathedral School, Cardiff

Awards
John Tomes Medal of the British Dental Association (2006)
FDSRCPS (special) (2011)

References

External links
List of academic publications while at Cardiff University

 

 
 
 

1958 births
Living people
Vice-Chancellors of Aberystwyth University
British women academics
British dentists
Alumni of the University of Birmingham
Academics of Cardiff University
Academic staff of the University of Otago